Zapf may refer to:

 Gudrun Zapf-von Hesse (born 1918), German typographer and calligrapher, wife of Hermann Zapf
 Helmut Zapf (born 1956), German composer
 Hermann Zapf (1918–2015), German typeface designer, professor, calligrapher, and typographer, husband of Gudrun Zapf-von Hesse
 Manfred Zapf (born 1946), German football player and manager
 Uta Zapf (born 1941), German Bundestag member (SPD)
 Vivien Zapf, research scientist at the Los Alamos National Laboratory, US
 Wolfgang Zapf (1937–2018), German sociologist

See also